Abbess Roding is a village in the civil parish of Abbess, Beauchamp and Berners Roding and the Epping Forest District of Essex, England. The village is included in the eight hamlets and villages called The Rodings.

History
According to A Dictionary of British Place Names, Roding derives from "Rodinges", as is listed in the Domesday Book and recorded earlier as such at c.1050, with the later variation 'Roinges Abbatisse' recorded in 1237. The 'Abbess' refers to the manorial possession by a man called 'Aitrop' held under the ownership of the Abbess of Barking Abbey.

In the Domesday account Abbess Roding is listed as in the Hundred of Ongar. The manor held 18 households, seven villagers, two smallholders, five slaves, and one freeman, with 2 lord's plough teams, 3.5 men's plough teams,  of meadow, and a woodland with 20 pigs. In 1066 there were 10 cattle, 40 pigs, 100 sheep and a cob. In 1086 there were 14 cattle, 60 pigs, 131 sheep, and three cobs. Before the Conquest, lordship was held by  Wulfmer of Eaton Socon; after given to Eudo Dapifer who was also Tenant-in-chief to William the Conqueror. A further source, the Domesday Book: A Complete Translation, gives a Domesday record of Abbess Roding being held by Geoffrey Martel as part of the land of Geoffrey de Mandeville.

Other traditional names for the village and its previous parish were 'Abbott's Roothing' or 'Abbots Roding'. It was in the Hundred of Ongar. At the Dissolution, Henry VIII sold the Barking Abbey's estate to Robert Chertsey. In 1882 Abbess Roding was in the Ongar Union—poor relief provision set up under the Poor Law Amendment Act 1834 —and part of the Rural Deanery of Ongar. The registers of the church of St Edmund date to 1560. The church, restored in 1867, had attached an 1882 benefice of a rectory with residence, in the gift of and held by Rev. Lawrence Capel Cure of Balliol College, Oxford. There also existed a Congregational chapel. Sir Henry Selwin-Ibbetson, Bt was Lord of the Manor and principal landowner. Crops grown at the time were chiefly wheat, barley and beans, on a heavy soil with a clay subsoil. Parish occupations included seven farmers, a beer retailer, and the licensee of The Anchor public house.

Since 1946, Abbess Roding has been part of the Abbess, Beauchamp and Berners Roding civil parish.

Governance
The village is in the parliamentary constituency of Brentwood & Ongar. The village is locally served by Abbess, Beauchamp and Berners Roding Parish Council.

Notable people 

 Sir Gamaliel Capell - Member of Parliament, owned Rookwood Hall.
 John Thurloe - secretary to the council of state in Protectorate England and spymaster for Oliver Cromwell, was born here.

References

External links

 Abbess Roding Church on Essex Churches website
 Map of Abbess Roding conservation Area
 Abbess, Beauchamp and Berners Roding Parish Council official website including Abbess Roding description. Retrieved 10 February 2018

Villages in Essex
Former civil parishes in Essex
Epping Forest District